The 2022–23 IUPUI Jaguars men's basketball team represented Indiana University–Purdue University Indianapolis in the 2022–23 NCAA Division I men's basketball season. The Jaguars, led by second-year head coach Matt Crenshaw, played their home games at Indiana Farmers Coliseum in Indianapolis, Indiana as members of the Horizon League. They finished the season 5–27, 2–18 in Horizon League play to finish in a tie for last place. As the No. 11 seed in the Horizon League tournament, they lost Robert Morris in the first round.

Previous season
The Jaguars finished the 2021–22 season 3–26, 1–16 in Horizon League play to finish in last in the conference. They lost in the first round of the Horizon League tournament to Oakland.

Offseason

Departures

Incoming transfers

Recruiting class

Roster

Schedule and results

|-
!colspan=12 style=| Exhibition

|-
!colspan=9 style=| Regular season

|-
!colspan=9 style=| Horizon League tournament

|-

Source

References

IUPUI Jaguars men's basketball seasons
IUPUI Jaguars
IUPUI Jaguars men's basketball
IUPUI Jaguars men's basketball